Agbaje is a surname.  Notable people with the surname include:

 Adewunmi Agbaje, Nigerian politician
 Bola Agbaje (born  1981), British playwright
 Esther Agbaje (born 1985), Nigerian-American attorney and politician
 Salami Agbaje (1880–1953), Nigerian businessman
 Tim Agbaje (born 1990), Canadian football player